The 2010–11 season is the 101st season of competitive football in Germany.

Diary of the season
7 August 2010 – Defending Bundesliga champions Bayern Munich defeat Schalke 04 2–0 to win the DFL Supercup. The first games in the women's DFB-Pokal are played.

13 August 2010 – The DFB-Pokal kicks off. The tournament features the 36 teams of the 1st and 2nd Bundesliga, the top four teams from the 3rd Liga, the 19 state cup champions, and the cup runners-up from Bavaria, Lower Saxony, and Westfalia.

15 August 2010 – The women's Bundesliga and 2nd Bundesliga seasons begin.

20 August 2010 – The Bundesliga season begins with a match between Bayern Munich and VfL Wolfsburg. Bayern win the match 2–1. The first matches of the 2nd Bundesliga are also played.

18 September 2010 – After three consecutive losses, VfB Stuttgart put on a scoring gala against Borussia Mönchengladbach. The 7–0 victory is one of the biggest in Bundesliga history.

2 October 2010 – With a 4–2 victory over 1899 Hoffenheim, Mainz 05 win their seventh consecutive Bundesliga match. Only on two other occasions has a club managed to win their first seven games of the season: Bayer Munich in 1995 and 1. FC Kaiserslautern in 2001.

13 October 2010 – Last place in the Bundesliga, VfB Stuttgart sack manager Christian Gross. The Swiss coach had taken over from Markus Babbel about a year and a half earlier. Assistant manager Jens Keller takes over the managers post in the interim.

24 October 2010 – 1. FC Köln relieve Zvonimir Soldo of his duties as manager, replacing him with reserve-team-manager Frank Schaefer. Soldo had replaced Christoph Daum as manager at the beginning of the previous season.

31 October 2010 – Having lost five of their six previous matches, Karlsruher SC sack Markus Schupp. KSC II manager Markus Kauczinski is appointed caretaker.

6 November 2010 – In the last two places in the 2. Bundesliga, both FC Ingolstadt and Arminia Bielefeld sack their managers. Michael Wiesinger had been appointed manager in Ingolstadt almost exactly one year prior, and had led the team to promotion from the 3. Liga. Christian Ziege had taken the reins in Bielefeld, his first senior managerial post, at the beginning of the season.

7 November 2010 – FC Ingolstadt appoint Benno Möhlmann as their new manager. Möhlmann had lasted managed Greuther Fürth, and had also previously managed Bundesliga club Hamburger SV. Arminia Bielefeld also appoint a new manager, Ewald Lienen, to replace Christian Ziege. Lienen had previously managed several German clubs. His most recent managerial post was with Olympiacos in Greece.

22 November 2010 – Three weeks after sacking Markus Schupp, Karlsruher SC hire Uwe Rapolder to replace him as manager. Rapolder had most recently managed TuS Koblenz, and had previously been in charge of other second division teams as well.

4 December 2010 – Two matchdays before the winter break, Borussia Dortmund win the so-called fall championship. After losing 2–1 to Eintracht Frankfurt, Dortmund's closest pursuer, Mainz 05, are unable to pass them until after the break.

11 December 2010 – Not having managed to keep his team clear of the relegation zone, Jens Keller is sacked as manager of VfB Stuttgart. He had only assumed the post two months earlier.

12 December 2010 – To replace Jens Keller, VfB Stuttgart sign Bruno Labbadia as manager. Labbadia had previously managed Hamburger SV, and Bayer Leverkusen.

19 December 2010 – The last Bundesliga matches before the winter break are played.

2 January 2011 – By mutual consent, 1899 Hoffenheim and Ralf Rangnick dissolve the latter's contract as manager. Rangnick had led Hoffenheim's rise from the third division, culminating in the fall championship in 2008. Assistant manager Marco Pezzaiuoli takes over the post of manager. Prior to joining Hoffenheim, Pezziauli had managed several of Germany's youth national teams.

7 January 2011 – For a record-breaking transfer fee between €31–35 million, Bosnian striker Edin Džeko leaves VfL Wolfsburg to join Manchester City.

7 February 2011 – Having won only 1 of the previous 11 matches, VfL Wolfsburg sack Englishman Steve McClaren as manager. McClaren had taken the reins at Wolfsburg at the beginning of the season. He is replaced by his assistant, Pierre Littbarski.

13 February 2011 – In eighteenth place in the Bundesliga since late November, Borussia Mönchengladbach sack manager Michael Frontzeck. Frontzeck had managed the club for a year and a half, helping the Gladbach avoid relegation the previous season.

14 February 2011 – To replace Michael Frontzeck, Borussia Mönchengladbach sign Swiss manager Lucien Favre. From 2007 to 2009, Favre had managed then-Bundesliga club Hertha BSC, who qualified for the UEFA Europa League twice under Favre.

22 February 2011 – Having dropped into the relegation zone in the 2. Bundesliga, Rot-Weiß Oberhausen sack Hans-Günter Bruns as manager. A German international during his playing career, Bruns had held various posts in Oberhausen since 2006.

24 February 2011 – Borussia Dortmund reserve team manager Theo Schneider transfers to Rot-Weiß Oberhausen. Besides managing the youth and reserve teams in Dortmund, Schneider briefly managed Arminia Bielefeld in 1994.

12 March 2011 – Scoring from a distance of 73 m, Georgios Tzavelas breaks the Bundesliga record for a goal scored from the greatest distance, and ends Eintracht Frankfurt's eight-game goalless spell. In spite of Greek defender's record-breaking goal, Frankfurt still lose the game to Schalke 04 by a score of 2–1.

13 March 2011 – The last matches in the Women's Bundesliga are played. One point ahead of runners-up 1. FFC Frankfurt, Turbine Potsdam win the championship, with both teams qualifying for the UEFA Women's Champions League. At the other end of the table, 1. FC Saarbrücken and Herforder SV are relegated.

13 March 2011 – Following a 6–0 loss Bayern Munich, Hamburger SV sack manager Armin Veh, replacing him with his assistant Michael Oenning. Veh had taken the managerial post at the beginning of the season.

16 March 2011 – In spite of successes in the DFB-Pokal and Champions League, Felix Magath is sacked as manager of Schalke 04. Under Magath, Schalke had finished second in the Bundesliga the previous season, but struggled especially at the beginning of the 2010–11 season. Magath had also faced criticism for his transfer policies.

17 March 2011 – Former 1899 Hoffenheim manager Ralf Rangnick fills the vacant managerial post at Schalke 04. In addition to successfully bringing Hoffenheim from the third division to the Bundesliga, Rangnick previously managed VfB Stuttgart and Hannover 96. This is Rangnick's second managerial stint for Schalke.

18 March 2011 – Just two days after being sacked by Schalke, Felix Magath signs on at VfL Wolfsburg as manager, replacing Pierre Littbarski. In 2008–09, Wolfsburg won the Bundesliga under Magath.

22 March 2011 – Having won only a single game since the winter break, Eintracht Frankfurt sack manager Michael Skibbe. Skibbe had taken the post at the beginning of the previous season following the resignation of Friedhelm Funkel, and led the team to a 10th-place finish. Skibbe's replacement is Christoph Daum, who previously managed several Bundesliga clubs and won the Turkish Süper Lig three times. He was also set to manage the Germany national team, but his agreement was dropped following a cocaine-use scandal.

26 March 2011 – By a score of 2–1, 1. FFC Frankfurt defeat league champions Turbine Potsdam in the final of the Women's DFB-Pokal. This is the eight time Frankfurt have won the cup, and marks their first title of any kind in three years.

1 April 2011 – After assistant referee Thorsten Schiffner was hit in the back of the neck with a filled beer cup thrown from the stands, referee Deniz Aytekin suspends the Bundesliga match between FC St. Pauli and Schalke 04 in the 89th minute. At the time of suspension, Schalke were leading 2–0 and two St. Pauli players had previously been ejected from the match.

9 April 2011 – Having already announced that manager Louis van Gaal would be leaving the club at the end of the season, Bayern Munich sack the Dutchman. Van Gaal had taken the reins at Bayern at the beginning of the previous season, and led the club to the championship, as well as winning the DFB-Pokal and a second-place finish in the Champions League. Van Gaal's assistant, Andries Jonker, takes over as caretaker.

25 April 2011 – With three more matches to be played, Hertha BSC secure promotion to the Bundesliga following a 1–0 victory over MSV Duisburg. Relegated from the Bundesliga the previous season, Hertha had been leading the 2. Bundesliga since January.

27 April 2011 – After three consecutive losses and his club at risk of relegation, Frank Schaefer resigns his post as manager of 1. FC Köln three weeks before the end of the season. Schaefer had taken over from Zvonimir Soldo earlier in the season. Volker Finke takes over the post in the interim, even though he had stated he would become manager upon his arrival in Cologne as Director of Sport several months earlier.

30 April 2011 – Following a 2–0 victory over 1. FC Nürnberg, Borussia Dortmund secure the German Championship with two matches to be played. Dortmund had been in first place in the Bundesliga since October. The win marked Borussia's fourth Bundesliga title.

7 May 2011 – On the second-to-last match day, Bayern Munich put on a scoring gala, beating FC St. Pauli 8–1. The loss results in St. Pauli being relegated to the 2. Bundesliga, having only been promoted from the second division the previous season.

14 May 2011 – The final matches in the Bundesliga are played. Borussia Dortmund had already secured the championship. Behind them, Bayer Leverkusen and Bayern Munich also qualify for the Champions League, while Hannover 96 and Mainz 05 qualify for the Europa League. At the other end of the table, Eintracht Frankfurt and FC St. Pauli are directly relegated, while Borussia Mönchengladbach finish 16th and are forced play a relegation play-off.

15 May 2011 – The 2. Bundesliga season concludes. Hertha BSC and FC Augsburg had secured promotion prior to the final match day. VfL Bochum qualify for the play-off against Borussia Mönchengladbach. Arminia Bielefeld and Rot-Weiß Oberhausen are relegated to the 3. Liga, and VfL Osnabrück play a relegation play-off against Dynamo Dresden.

19 May 2011 – With a last minute goal by Igor de Camargo, Borussia Mönchengladbach win the first leg of the Bundesliga relegation play-off by a score of 1–0 over VfL Bochum.

20 May 2011 – Dynamo Dresden host VfL Osnabrück in the first leg of the 2. Bundesliga relegation play-off. The match ends in a 1–1 draw.

21 May 2011 – By a score of 5–0, Schalke 04 win the final of the DFB-Pokal over MSV Duisburg. It marked Schalke's fifth cup, and the club's first trophy since 2002.

24 May 2011 – In the second leg of the 2. Bundesliga relegation play-off, VfL Osnabrück and Dynamo Dresden play to another 1–1 draw over 90 minutes. Dresden score twice in extra time, winning the tie 4–2 on aggregate and earning promotion to the 2. Bundesliga.

25 May 2011 – Borussia Mönchengladbach manage a 1–1 draw against VfL Bochum in the second leg of the Bundesliga relegation play-off. Having won the first leg, Gladbach win the tie 2–1 and retain their place in the Bundesliga.

26 June 2011 – 73,680 spectator's attend the opening ceremonies of the 2011 FIFA World Cup in Berlin's Olympic Stadium, a record for women's football. Germany win the opening fixture over Canada by 2–1.

9 July 2011 – Germany's World Cup campaign ends with a quarter-final loss to Japan by a score of 1–0 in extra time.

Men's national team

The home team is on the left column; the away team is on the right column.

Friendly matches

Euro 2012 Qualifying

The German men's national team were drawn into UEFA Euro 2012 qualifying Group A.

All fixtures for this group were negotiated between the participants at a meeting in Frankfurt, Germany on 21 and 22 February 2010.

Women's national team
As hosts of the 2011 FIFA World Cup, Germany did not have to play qualifying.

Friendlies
The home team is on the left column; the away team is on the right column.

2011 FIFA Women's World Cup

League season

Bundesliga

2. Bundesliga

3. Liga

Bundesliga (women)

2. Bundesliga (women)

Note: Reserve teams from Fußball-Bundesliga sides were not eligible for promotion.

Transfer deals

Retirements
7 December 2010 – Oliver Neuville, 37, striker for Arminia Bielefeld, Bayer Leverkusen, Hansa Rostock, and Borussia Mönchengladbach. Born in Switzerland, Neuville began his career there playing for Servette FC, and played for CD Tenerife in Spain before coming to Germany. From 1998 to 2008, he earned 69 caps for the German national team.

Deaths
 3 July 2010 – Herbert Erhardt, 79, defender for Bayern Munich and Greuther Fürth. He was a member of the 1954 West Germany World Cup-winning squad, as well as the 1958 and 1962 World Cup squads.
 19 August 2010 – Johannes Riedl, 60, player for 1. FC Kaiserslautern and MSV Duisburg among others.
 22 October 2010 – Franz Raschid, 56, midfielder for Bayer 05 Uerdingen and manager for Arminia Bielefeld.
 12 December 2010 – Peter Pagel, 54, striker for Tennis Borussia Berlin and Hertha BSC.
 11 February 2011 – Willi Gerdau, 81, midfielder for Heider SV. He earned one cap with the West Germany national team.
 11 February 2011 – Josef Pirrung, 61, player for 1. FC Kaiserslautern and Wormatia Worms who earned two caps for the West Germany national team.
 13 February 2011 – Edgar Burkart, 66, former president of Greuther Fürth.
 28 February 2011 – Günter Mast, 84, former president of Eintracht Braunschweig.
 18 June 2011 – Ulrich Biesinger, 77, forward for BC Augsburg and others. He was a member of the 1954 World Cup-winning West Germany squad.

References

 
Seasons in German football